Mikhail Zaritskiy (born 3 January 1973) is a retired Luxembourgian professional footballer. He was born in Leningrad, now St. Petersburg, Russian SFSR, grew up in the Soviet Union and later gained Luxembourg citizenship through marriage.

Zaritskiy spent most of his career in Luxembourg, starting with FC Avenir Beggen and having two spells at Sporting Mertzig, either side of a spell in Germany and Greece. In his seven years playing in the Luxembourg National Division, Zaritskiy was the league's top goal-scorer four times.  He was named Luxembourgian Footballer of the Year twice.

Honours
 Luxembourg National Division champion: 1994.
 Luxembourgian Footballer of the Year: 1997, 1998.
 Luxembourg National Division top scorer: 1996 (18 goals), 1997 (19 goals), 1998 (29 goals), 2001 (23 goals).

References

External links

1973 births
Living people
Soviet footballers
Soviet expatriate footballers
Russian footballers
Russian expatriate footballers
Expatriate footballers in Germany
Expatriate footballers in Luxembourg
Expatriate footballers in Greece
Luxembourgian footballers
Luxembourg international footballers
Luxembourgian expatriate footballers
Luxembourgian expatriate sportspeople in Greece
FC Zenit Saint Petersburg players
FC Avenir Beggen players
SC Fortuna Köln players
Borussia Mönchengladbach II players
Russian emigrants to Luxembourg
Footballers from Saint Petersburg
Luxembourgian football managers
FC Blue Boys Muhlenbach managers
CS Grevenmacher managers
Association football forwards